Fioravanti is an Italian surname. Notable people with the surname include:

 Aristotile Fioravanti (1415 or 14201486), Italian architect and engineer
 Danilo Fioravanti (1913–1997), Italian gymnast
 Domenico Fioravanti (born 1977), Italian Olympic swimmer
 Giulio Fioravanti (19221999), Italian operatic baritone
 Giuseppe Fioravanti (1790s1850), Italian operatic bass, son of Valentino Fioravanti
 Leonardo Fioravanti (doctor) (15181588), Italian doctor
 Leonardo Fioravanti (engineer) (born 1938), Italian car designer
 Luigi Fioravanti (born 1981), Italian-American professional mixed martial artist
 Marcos Christino Fioravanti (1775–1862), Italian surgeon
 Valentino Fioravanti (17641837), Italian opera composer, father of Giuseppe Fioravanti
 Valerio Fioravanti (born 1958), Italian terrorist
 Vincenzo Fioravanti (1799–1877), Italian opera composer

Italian-language surnames
Fioravanti Family. A noble family from Pistoia and Florence.